"Don't Drink the Water" is a song by the Dave Matthews Band, released as the first single from their album Before These Crowded Streets. The song, which features guest vocals by Alanis Morissette and banjo playing by Béla Fleck, addresses apartheid in South Africa and the persecution of the Native Americans. 

Music videos were made to promote three singles from the album, with "Don't Drink the Water" as the first.

Track listing

U.S. single
"Don't Drink the Water" (Edit) – 4:35
"Don't Drink the Water" (Album Version) – 7:03

Australia single
"Don't Drink the Water" (Edit) – 4:35
"Crash into Me" (Live) – 5:33
"Tripping Billies" (Live) – 5:28

Live releases
Listener Supported
Live in Chicago 12.19.98
Live at Folsom Field, Boulder, Colorado
The Central Park Concert
The Gorge (Special Edition)
Live Trax Vol. 1
The Complete Weekend on the Rocks
Live Trax Vol. 6
The Best of What's Around Vol. 1
Live Trax Vol. 9
Live at Radio City
Live Trax Vol. 10
Live at Piedmont Park
Live at Mile High Music Festival
Live Trax Vol. 14
Live Trax Vol. 15
Europe 2009

Charts

References

1998 singles
Dave Matthews Band songs
Songs written by Dave Matthews
Song recordings produced by Steve Lillywhite
1998 songs